Bishop Paul Francis Reding Secondary School is a coeducational Catholic Secondary School in Milton, Ontario, Canada. The school offers grades nine through twelve and is run by the Halton Catholic District School Board.

History
Bishop Reding, commonly called BR, was founded in 1986. Its namesake is Bishop Paul Francis Reding, Bishop of the Hamilton Diocese for ten years and an ardent defender of Catholic education. The school was the first Catholic high school for Northern Halton. In 1994, the school participated in a 25-year HCDSB time capsule project, opened in 2019. In 2002, many of Bishop Reding's students were transferred to the new school in Halton Hills, Christ the King Catholic Secondary School, a change commemorated with a plaque in the BR Trophy Case. Similarly, in 2013, many BR students were redistricted due to a population swell in Milton, to Jean Vanier Catholic Secondary School. Milton MPP and Wynne Government Education Minister, Indira Naidoo-Harris, announced an $18 million extension to BR that would cut the number of portable classrooms down from 51 to 27, by the 2020–2021 school year. After it was temporarily cancelled by the Ford Government, Milton MPP Parm Gill announced that funding would be reallocated for the Bishop Reding expansion. Bishop Reding has been noted for their student involvement, notably holding walkouts protesting both the controversial HCDSB Sanctity of Life motion, organized by student leaders Karyssa Chan, Margaret Manangan, and Ashwini Selvakumaran, and the Ford Government's cuts to education and OSAP.

Athletics
The school's athletics programs include:

Badminton
Baseball
Basketball
Cross country running
Curling - 2016, 2019 HCAA Champions
Rugby
Football
Hockey
Ping pong
Softball
Soccer – 2004, 2009 ( GIRLS ), 2022 OFSAA Champions
Swimming
Ultimate Frisbee – 2008 OFSAA Spirit Champions and 2019 HCAA Champions
Volleyball
Track and field

Extracurriculars

BR DECA/Business Club 
DECA at Bishop Reding  has reached the provincial level. In 2019 five students qualified for the DECA International Conference (ICDC) in Orlando, Florida, these five being the only five from the entire Halton Catholic District School Board to attend. BR DECA goes hand-in-hand with the Business Club, founded in 2019 which raises funds and arranges sales, primarily to run the BR's Got Talent talent show.

Model UN 
The BR Model UN club participates in the Southern Ontario Model UN Assembly, hosted at the University of Toronto.

BR STEM Team 
The BR Stem Team works to further studies of sciences, technology, engineering, and math at Bishop Reding and the feeder schools. In 2016, the Team hosted their first student-run conference.

The Royal Register 
Although Bishop Reding has had a newspaper by the name of the Royal Report that was founded in 1986, its last publication was in 1989. That is why the Royal Register was created in 2018 as a primarily online publication, in light of ecological and practical concerns regarding a print newspaper.

Reach for the Top 
Bishop Reding's Reach Team has operated for over 15 years. In 2018-2019 year the Senior team qualified for the Reach Provincial Competition. The official mascot of the team is James Bui, a fictional anime construct of an ideal reach competitor.

Notable alumni
Shawn Hill, MLB pitcher for the Detroit Tigers
Matt O'Meara, CFL Offensive Lineman for the Winnipeg Blue Bombers
Joey Melo, former MLS soccer player for Toronto FC.
 Ben Preisner, Olympic marathoner.

See also
List of high schools in Ontario

References

External links
Official web site
Halton Catholic District School Board web site

High schools in the Regional Municipality of Halton
Milton, Ontario
Catholic secondary schools in Ontario
Educational institutions established in 1986
1986 establishments in Ontario